Wole Talabi is a Nigerian author of speculative fiction and editor. The Scientific American described him as an author who "...blends transhumanism and the Turing test". 

He is considered to be among the Third Generation of Nigerian Writers.

Awards and recognition
 Winner of ROSL Readers' Award in Caine Prize For African Writing.
Nominated for 2021 Locus Award for Best Anthology.
Winner for 2018 Nommo Award for Best Speculative fiction short story.
Finalist for Baen Books' 2022 Jim Baen Memorial Short Story Award.

Bibliography
Anthologies
Incomplete Solutions (2019)
Anthologies
Lights Out: Resurrection (2016)
Africanfuturism: An Anthology (2020)
Short Fiction
Zombies (2013)
Crocodile Ark (2014)
Eye (2015)
A Short History of Migration in Five Fragments of You (2015)
Nested (2016)
Wednesday's Story (2016)
If They Can Learn (2016)
Necessary and Sufficient Conditions (2016)
I, Shigidi (2016)
The Last Lagosian (2016)
Home Is Where My Mother's Heart Is Buried (2017)
Nneoma (2017)
The Regression Test (2017)
The Harmonic Resonance of Ejiro Anaborhi (2018)
Drift-Flux (2018)
When We Dream We Are Our God (2019) 
Incompleteness Theories (2019)
Abeokuta52 (2019)
Tends to Zero (2019)
Comments on Your Provisional Patent Application for An Eternal Spirit Core (2021)
An Arc of Electric Skin (2021)

References

Nigerian writers
Nommo Award winners
Nigerian science fiction writers
Nigerian fantasy writers
Year of birth missing (living people)
Living people